Kolyai (also Romanized as Kolyā'ī, Kurdish: Kolyanî, Kolyaî) is a village in Mahidasht Rural District, Mahidasht District, Kermanshah County, Kermanshah Province, Rojhilat Kurdistan Iran. At the 2006 census, its population was 357, in 82 families.

References 

Populated places in Kermanshah County